In mathematics, a set  of vectors in a vector space  is called a basis if every element of  may be written in a unique way as a finite linear combination of elements of . The elements of a basis are called .

In other words, a basis is a linearly independent spanning set.

A vector space can have several bases; however all the bases have the same number of elements, called the dimension of the vector space.

This article deals mainly with finite-dimensional vector spaces. However, many of the principles are also valid for infinite-dimensional vector spaces.

Definition 
A basis  of a vector space  over a field  (such as the real numbers  or the complex numbers ) is a linearly independent subset of  that spans .
linear independence
spanning property

The scalars  are called the coordinates of the vector  with respect to the basis , and by the first property they are uniquely determined.

A vector space that has a finite basis is called finite-dimensional. In this case, the finite subset can be taken as  itself to check for linear independence in the above definition.

It is often convenient or even necessary to have an ordering on the basis vectors, for example, when discussing orientation, or when one considers the scalar coefficients of a vector with respect to a basis without referring explicitly to the basis elements. In this case, the ordering is necessary for associating each coefficient to the corresponding basis element. This ordering can be done by numbering the basis elements.

Examples 

The set  of the ordered pairs of real numbers is a vector space under the operations of component-wise addition
 
and scalar multiplication
 
where  is any real number.

Let  be the -tuple with all components equal to 0, except the th, which is 1.

A different flavor of example is given by polynomial rings. One basis for this space is the monomial basis , consisting of all monomials:  Any set of polynomials such that there is exactly one polynomial of each degree (such as the Bernstein basis polynomials or Chebyshev polynomials) is also a basis. (Such a set of polynomials is called a polynomial sequence.) But there are also many bases for  that are not of this form.

Properties 

Most properties resulting from the Steinitz exchange lemma remain true when there is no finite spanning set, but their proofs in the infinite case generally require the axiom of choice or a weaker form of it, such as the ultrafilter lemma.

If  is a vector space over a field , then:
 If  is a linearly independent subset of a spanning set , then there is a basis  such that 
  has a basis (this is the preceding property with  being the empty set, and ).
This is the dimension theorem.
 A linearly independent set  is a basis if and only if it is maximal, that is, it is not a proper subset of any linearly independent set.

If  is a vector space of dimension , then:

Coordinates  

Let  be a vector space of finite dimension  over a field , and 

By definition of a basis, every  in  may be written, in a unique way, as

However, if one talks of the set of the coefficients, one loses the correspondence between coefficients and basis elements, and several vectors may have the same set of coefficients. For example,  and  have the same set of coefficients , and are different. It is therefore often convenient to work with an ordered basis; this is typically done by indexing the basis elements by the first natural numbers. Then, the coordinates of a vector form a sequence similarly indexed, and a vector is completely characterized by the sequence of coordinates. An ordered basis is also called a frame, a word commonly used, in various contexts, for referring to a sequence of data allowing defining coordinates.

This set is an -vector space, with addition and scalar multiplication defined component-wise. The map 

is a linear isomorphism from the vector space  onto .

Change of basis 

Let  be a vector space of dimension  over a field . It is useful to describe the old coordinates in terms of the new ones, because, in general, one has expressions involving the old coordinates, and if one wants to obtain equivalent expressions in terms of the new coordinates; this is obtained by replacing the old coordinates by their expressions in terms of the new coordinates.

Typically, the new basis vectors are given by their coordinates over the old basis, that is, 

This formula may be concisely written in matrix notation.

The formula can be proven by considering the decomposition of the vector  on the two bases: one has 

and

The change-of-basis formula results then from the uniqueness of the decomposition of a vector over a basis, here  that is

Related notions

Free module
 
If one replaces the field occurring in the definition of a vector space by a ring, one gets the definition of a module. For modules, linear independence and spanning sets are defined exactly as for vector spaces, although "generating set" is more commonly used than that of "spanning set".

Like for vector spaces, a basis of a module is a linearly independent subset that is also a generating set. A major difference with the theory of vector spaces is that not every module has a basis. A module that has a basis is called a free module. Free modules play a fundamental role in module theory, as they may be used for describing the structure of non-free modules through free resolutions.

A module over the integers is exactly the same thing as an abelian group. Thus a free module over the integers is also a free abelian group. Free abelian groups have specific properties that are not shared by modules over other rings.

Analysis 
In the context of infinite-dimensional vector spaces over the real or complex numbers, the term  (named after Georg Hamel) or algebraic basis can be used to refer to a basis as defined in this article. This is to make a distinction with other notions of "basis" that exist when infinite-dimensional vector spaces are endowed with extra structure. The most important alternatives are orthogonal bases on Hilbert spaces, Schauder bases, and Markushevich bases on normed linear spaces. In the case of the real numbers R viewed as a vector space over the field Q of rational numbers, Hamel bases are uncountable, and have specifically the cardinality of the continuum, which is the cardinal number  where  is the smallest infinite cardinal, the cardinal of the integers.

The common feature of the other notions is that they permit the taking of infinite linear combinations of the basis vectors in order to generate the space. This, of course, requires that infinite sums are meaningfully defined on these spaces, as is the case for topological vector spaces – a large class of vector spaces including e.g. Hilbert spaces, Banach spaces, or Fréchet spaces.

The preference of other types of bases for infinite-dimensional spaces is justified by the fact that the Hamel basis becomes "too big" in Banach spaces: If X is an infinite-dimensional normed vector space which is complete (i.e. X is a Banach space), then any Hamel basis of X is necessarily uncountable. This is a consequence of the Baire category theorem. The completeness as well as infinite dimension are crucial assumptions in the previous claim. Indeed, finite-dimensional spaces have by definition finite bases and there are infinite-dimensional (non-complete) normed spaces which have countable Hamel bases. Consider  the space of the sequences  of real numbers which have only finitely many non-zero elements, with the norm  Its standard basis, consisting of the sequences having only one non-zero element, which is equal to 1, is a countable Hamel basis.

Example 
In the study of Fourier series, one learns that the functions  are an "orthogonal basis" of the (real or complex) vector space of all (real or complex valued) functions on the interval [0, 2π] that are square-integrable on this interval, i.e., functions f satisfying

The functions  are linearly independent, and every function f that is square-integrable on [0, 2π] is an "infinite linear combination" of them, in the sense that

for suitable (real or complex) coefficients ak, bk. But many square-integrable functions cannot be represented as finite linear combinations of these basis functions, which therefore do not comprise a Hamel basis. Every Hamel basis of this space is much bigger than this merely countably infinite set of functions. Hamel bases of spaces of this kind are typically not useful, whereas orthonormal bases of these spaces are essential in Fourier analysis.

Geometry
The geometric notions of an affine space, projective space, convex set, and cone have related notions of  basis. An affine basis for an n-dimensional affine space is  points in general linear position. A  is  points in general position, in a projective space of dimension n. A  of a polytope is the set of the vertices of its convex hull. A  consists of one point by edge of a polygonal cone. See also a Hilbert basis (linear programming).

Random basis
This observation has led to techniques for approximating random bases.

It is difficult to check numerically the linear dependence or exact orthogonality. Therefore, the notion of ε-orthogonality is used.

In high dimensions, two independent random vectors are with high probability almost orthogonal, and the number of independent random vectors, which all are with given high probability pairwise almost orthogonal, grows exponentially with dimension. More precisely, consider equidistribution in n-dimensional ball. Choose N independent random vectors from a ball (they are independent and identically distributed). Let θ be a small positive number. Then for

 random vectors are all pairwise ε-orthogonal with probability . This property of random bases is a manifestation of the so-called .

The figure (right) illustrates distribution of lengths N of pairwise almost orthogonal chains of vectors that are independently randomly sampled from the n-dimensional cube  as a function of dimension, n. A point is first randomly selected in the cube. The second point is randomly chosen in the same cube. If the angle between the vectors was within  then the vector was retained. At the next step a new vector is generated in the same hypercube, and its angles with the previously generated vectors are evaluated. If these angles are within  then the vector is retained. The process is repeated until the chain of almost orthogonality breaks, and the number of such pairwise almost orthogonal vectors (length of the chain) is recorded. For each n, 20 pairwise almost orthogonal chains were constructed numerically for each dimension. Distribution of the length of these chains is presented.

Proof that every vector space has a basis

Let  be any vector space over some field .

Let . Thus this shows that  spans .

Hence  is linearly independent and spans .

This proof relies on Zorn's lemma, which is equivalent to the axiom of choice. Conversely, it has been proved that if every vector space has a basis, then the axiom of choice is true. Thus the two assertions are equivalent.

See also
Basis of a matroid
Basis of a linear program

Notes

References

General references

Historical references
 
 
 
 
 
 , reprint:

External links
 Instructional videos from Khan Academy
Introduction to bases of subspaces
Proof that any subspace basis has same number of elements
 
 

Articles containing proofs
Axiom of choice
Linear algebra